Bela menkhorsti is a species of sea snail, a marine gastropod mollusk in the family Mangeliidae.

Distribution
This species occurs in the Mediterranean Sea and in the Atlantic Ocean off the Azores.

References

 Gofas, S.; Le Renard, J.; Bouchet, P. (2001). Mollusca, in: Costello, M.J. et al. (Ed.) (2001). European register of marine species: a check-list of the marine species in Europe and a bibliography of guides to their identification. Collection Patrimoines Naturels, 50: pp. 180–213
 Peñas A., Rolán E. & Ballesteros M., 2008: Segunda adición a la fauna malacológica del litoral de Garraf (NE de la Península Ibérica). Iberus 26(2): 15-42
 Van Aartsen  JJ  1988a  European  Mollusca:  notes  on less well-known  species.  XII.  Bela  menkhorsti nom. nov. = Pleurotoma nana Scacchi, 1836 not Deshayes, 1835  and  Fehria  (nov.  gen.)  zenetouae  nov.  spec.  La Conchiglia 20 (232–233): 30–31

External links
  Mariottini et al., A new fossil conoidean from the Pliocene of Italy, with comments on the Bela menkhorsti complex (Gastropoda: Conidae); Journal of Conchology 40(1):5-14 · October 2009

menkhorsti